Coal India Limited (CIL) is an Indian central public sector undertaking under the ownership of the Ministry of Coal, Government of India. It is headquartered at Kolkata. It is the largest government-owned-coal-producer in the world. It is also the seventh largest employer in India with nearly 272,000 employees.

The PSU contributes around 82% to the total coal production in India. In April 2011, CIL was conferred the Maharatna status by the Government of India, making it one of the seven with that status. As of 14 October 2015, CIL is a PSU owned by the Central Government of India which controls its operations through the Ministry of Coal. As of 14 October 2015, CIL's market capitalisation stood at  making it India's 8th most valuable company.

CIL ranks 8th among the top 20 firms responsible for a third of all global carbon emissions.

History
Coal mining in India had primarily been a private sector enterprise. This changed in September 1956 when the Government of India established its own coal company National Coal Development Corporation (NCDC). Collieries run by the Railways formed the nucleus of NCDC. This was to fulfill the fast growing energy requirements in the country to support rapid industrialization taking place through Five-Year Plans of the Government. In the same year, Singareni Colliery Company, which was operating in Andhra Pradesh since 1920, was also brought under the Government control when the Central Government and state Government of Andhra Pradesh acquired 45% and 55% shares respectively.

In 1971, the Government of India nationalized all the 214 coking-coal mines and 12 coke-ovens running in the private sector, excluding those held by TISCO and IISCO for their captive use. On 1 January 1972, a new Government company Bharat Coking Coal Limited (BCCL) was formed to take control of these nationalized mines and coke-ovens. On 30 January 1973, all the remaining 711 non-coking coalmines of the country in private sector were also nationalized. 184 of these mines were handed over to BCCL, and remaining 527 were handed over to a newly opened department Coal Mines Authority. 4 months later, on 14 June 1973, this department was converted into a separate Government company CMAL. NCDC, earlier formed in 1957, was merged with CMAL, and 45% share-holding of Central Government in Singareni Collieries Company Ltd was also handed over to CMAL. CMAL started functioning with its 4 divisions, viz, Eastern Coalfields, Central Coalfields, Western Coalfields, and Central Mine Planning and Design Institute.

By 1973, all coking coalmines were under BCCL, which was functioning as a subsidiary of Steel Authority of India (SAIL) under Department of Steel of the Ministry of Steel and Mines; and all non-coking coalmines were under CMAL, which was under Department of Mines of the Ministry of Steel and Mines. For better control, both BCCL and CMAL were brought on 11 October 1974 under the Department of Coal (now an independent Ministry) of the newly formed Ministry of Energy.

On 1 November 1975, a new public-sector company Coal India Limited (CIL) was formed to enable better organizational and operational efficiency in coal sector. All the 4 Divisions of CMAL were given the company status, and were brought under CIL along with BCCL. 45% share-holding of the CMAL in Singareni Collieries Company was also transferred to CIL, and CMAL was closed.

Thus, CIL started functioning in 1975 with 5 subsidiary companies under it. These were Bharat Coking Coal Limited (BCCL), Eastern Coalfields Limited (ECL), Central Coalfields Limited (CCL), Western Coalfields Limited (WCL), and Central Mine Planning & Design Institute Limited (CMPDIL). In due course of time, 3 more companies were formed under CIL by carving out certain areas of CCL and WCL. These were Northern Coalfields Limited (NCL), South-Eastern Coalfields Limited (SECL), and Mahanadi Coalfields Limited (MCL).

Pursuant to the Fuel Policy of 1974, CIL also started the construction of India's First Low Temperature Carbonisation Plant at Dankuni in the late 1970s. It was renamed as Dankuni Coal Complex, and is one of the only operational Coal gas plant of this kind in the world. Dankuni Coal Complex has been incurring heavy loss due to the Greater Calcutta Gas Supply Company (formerly known as Oriental Gas Co.) giving non-remunerative price and fixing them unilaterally. Coal India is planning to venture into Coal-to-Methanol technology at the existing Plant.

The Government of India held 100% equity of CIL from 1975 till 2010.

Initial public offering
The IPO was oversubscribed by 14.17 times. Against an IPO issue size of  it received bids for  making it the second highest collections in any IPO in India. On the first day of its listing on the stock market, its shares soared 40% higher than IPO price. CIL was included in the 30-member BSE SENSEX on 8 August 2011.

On 30 January 2015, in an offer for sale (OFS), Government of India sold a further 10% stake in CIL.

Operations
CIL is the largest coal producing company in the world. It produced 536.51 MT (million tonne) coal during FY 2015–16. Coal India operates through 83 mining areas in 8 states of India. As on 1 April 2015, it has 430 coal mines out of which 175 are open cast, 227 are underground and 28 are mixed mines. Production from open cast mines during FY 2014–15 was 92.91% of total production of 494.24 MT. Underground mines contributed to 7.09% of production. CIL further operates 15 coal washeries, out of which 12 are for coking coal and 3 are for non-coking coal with 23.30 MTY and 13.50 MTY capacities respectively. CIL's only Low Temperature Carbonisation Plant of Dankuni Coal Complex is currently run on lease basis by its subsidiary SECL. In addition to above, it also manages 200 other establishments like workshops, hospitals, training institutes, mine-rescue setups, etc.

Subsidiaries

CIL produces coal through seven of its wholly owned subsidiaries. These are Eastern Coalfields Limited (ECL), Bharat Coking Coal Limited (BCCL), Central Coalfields Limited (CCL), Western Coalfields Limited (WCL), South Eastern Coalfields Limited (SECL), Northern Coalfield Limited (NCL), and Mahanadi Coalfields Limited (MCL). Its 8th wholly owned subsidiary Central Mine Planning & Design Institute Limited (CMPDIL) provides exploration, planning and technical support to all the 7 production subsidiaries. CMPDIL also provides consulting services to third-party market clients in the field of exploration, mining, allied engineering & testing, management-systems, training, etc. The North Eastern Coalfields (NEC) and Dankuni Coal Complex (DCC) are owned directly by the parent holding company of CIL. However, DCC has been leased to SECL since 1995.

CIL also has a wholly owned subsidiary in Mozambique, Coal India Africana Limitada (CIAL) for pursuing coal mining opportunities in that country.

The details of number of employees, revenue for FY 2012–13 and production of coal is given in the table below:

Joint Ventures: CIL has two joint ventures -
 International Coal Ventures Private Limited (ICVPL) was formed in 2009 for acquisition of coking coal properties outside India. CIL holds th share in paid up capital of ICVPL.
 CIL-NTPC Urja Private Limited is a 50:50 JV between CIL and NTPC, formed in April 2010 for acquisition of coal blocks in India and abroad.

Listing and shareholding
Listing: CIL's equity shares are listed on [Bombay Stock Exchange] where it is a constituent of the BSE SENSEX index and the National Stock Exchange of India where it is a constituent of the S&P CNX Nifty.

Shareholding: On 30 January 2015, 79.65% of the equity shares of the company were owned by the Government of India and the remaining 20.35% were owned by others. On 30 January 2015, in an Offer For Sale (OFS), Government of India sold a further 10% stake in CIL. On 18 November 2015, Government of India approved another 10% stake sale in CIL.

Employees
Coal India had 333,097 employees as on 31 March 2015, out of which 314,259 were Non-Executives and 18,838 were Executives.

Awards and recognitions
 Coal India Limited (CIL) was conferred with two Corporate Social Responsibility Awards on 18 February 2013: 'Global CSR Excellence and Leadership Award' for Best Corporate Social Responsibility Practices and 'Blue Dart Most Caring Companies of India Award'.
 For 2012, CIL earned a ranking of 48 on overall global performance in the 'Platts Top 250 Global Energy Company Rankings'.
 CIL features on the Forbes Global 2000 rankings for 2012 at position 377. Coal India on the Forbes Global 2000 List Forbes 31 May 2013 19 October 2013
 In December 2012, it was ranked as the 9th on the Fortune India 500 list. IOC retains top slot in Fortune 500 India list as of in The Hindu 15 December 2012 19 October 2013
 CIL was conferred with 'Company of the Year Award' in a function organized by Indian Chamber of Commerce and Department of Public Enterprises (DPE) in September 2011 at 2nd Summit on 'India Public Sector Agenda @2020' at New Delhi.
Many of Its employees are conferred with a job in lieu of land. The one being the largest Penganga Opencast of WCL, New Majri UG To OC, Makardhokra etc.
This year, one of its employees named "Shardaprasad Prajapati (NEIS-54262)" has been conferred with the "Youngest" Employee to be given a job in lieu of land acquired in Majri Area of Western Coalfields Limited.

Profit 
The quarterly profit ended on 31 March’22.

Coal India reported a rise of almost 46% in its net profit for the quarter ended March 31, 2022 in consolidated terms. India’s biggest coal miner had posted a consolidated net profit of ₹4,586.78 crore in the year-ago period.

The company registered sales worth ₹30,046.25 crore during the quarter under review compared with ₹24,510.80 crore. Total revenue from operations stood at ₹32,706.77 crore during Q4 FY22, against ₹26,700.14 crore in Q4 FY21.

Green initiatives
Green initiatives: CIL planted 1.57 million saplings during 2014–15. In its Annual Report for 2014–15, it informed that it has planted around 82 million trees over an area of around 33700 Ha.

Criticism
Operating 239 mines without environment clearance: In September 2011, CAG criticised CIL for operating 239 mines in seven coal producing subsidiaries, which existed prior to 1994, without environmental clearance. These mines included 48 open-cast, 170 underground and 21 combined mines. In its report, the CAG also pointed out that of the 18 sample open-cast and eight underground mines, ten mines had undertaken capacity expansion without environmental clearances. The company, in its reply, said that applications for clearances to the projects have already been submitted to the Ministry of Environment and Forests.

Coal mines near Tiger Reserves: In India, some coal mines are located near/below the tiger reserves. Mining or construction of administrative offices in/near these reserves disturbs the wildlife. Hence environmental organisations like Greenpeace have been opposing mining in these areas. Around 50% of the energy requirements of India are met by coal. Hence the protection of wildlife is sometimes overlooked due to this fact. In its argument, the CIL said that in many cases it only does underground mining which does not hurt the forests above.

Accidents during mining: CIL in its Annual Report for FY 2012-13 reported lowest ever figures of average 66 deaths and 251 serious accidents per year for the period 2010-2012 indicating that safety at workplace is improving over the years. Critics claim that the safety practices in most mines are inadequate, which is causing too many casualties. It is also claimed that many accidents and deaths are not recorded and hence are not part of 'official figures'.

Carbon Emissions: CIL ranks 8th among the top 20 firms behind a third of all global carbon emissions

See also

 List of companies of India
 List of largest companies by revenue
 List of corporations by market capitalization
 Make in India
 Forbes Global 2000
 Fortune India 500
 Coal mining in India

References

External links
 

Coal companies of India
Companies based in Kolkata
Government-owned companies of India
Energy companies established in 1975
Non-renewable resource companies established in 1975
NIFTY 50
Ministry of Coal
Recipients of the Rashtriya Khel Protsahan Puruskar
Coal India
1975 establishments in West Bengal
Indian companies established in 1975
Companies listed on the National Stock Exchange of India
Companies listed on the Bombay Stock Exchange